Clanculus persicus is a species of sea snail, a marine gastropod mollusk in the family Trochidae, the top snails.

Description
The size of the shell varies between 15 mm and 24.8 mm.

Distribution
This marine species occurs off the Philippines and New Zealand.

References

External links
 To Encyclopedia of Life
 To World Register of Marine Species
 

persicus
Gastropods described in 1964